Damon Shanel Watts (born April 8, 1972) is a former American football cornerback in the National Football League who played for the Indianapolis Colts. He played college football for the Indiana Hoosiers.

References

1972 births
Living people
American football cornerbacks
Indianapolis Colts players
Indiana Hoosiers football players